Koichi Morita may refer to:

 Koichi Morita (army officer) (1865–1929), Japanese army officer 
 Koichi Morita (songwriter) (born 1940), Japanese composer and singer